Throne of Glass is a high fantasy novel series by American author Sarah J. Maas, beginning with the entry of the same name, released in August 2012. The story follows the journey of Celaena Sardothien, a teenage assassin in a corrupt kingdom with a tyrannical ruler, the King of Adarlan.  As the tale progresses, Celaena forms unexpected bonds and uncovers a conspiracy amidst her adventures. The series concluded with the eighth book in October 2018.

The series appeared on the New York Times Best Seller list, and has been optioned by Hulu and Disney-ABC Domestic Television for a television series adaptation by Mark Gordon.

Overview
Throne of Glass follows Celaena Sardothien, an 18-year-old assassin in the Kingdom of Adarlan. After a year of suffering for her crimes in a slave camp called Endovier, she accepts the offer of Crown Prince Dorian, the King of Adarlan's son, to compete with other assassins and thieves for a chance to serve as the King's Champion, and eventually gain her freedom after four years in the King's service. This leads her to form unexpected bonds with Chaol, the Captain of the Guard, and Dorian, the Crown Prince of Adarlan. Over time, Celaena is drawn into a conspiracy and a series of battles, leading to discoveries surrounding both the Kingdom and herself.

Books

Main series

Companion books
 Throne of Glass Coloring Book (2016)

Companion game 
Embers of Memory, a two-person card game based on the Throne of Glass book series, was released in October 2019 by Osprey Games. It is set during the events of the final book in the series, Kingdom of Ash. The players are tasked with helping Aelin survive her imprisonment and ordeal at the hands of Maeve, diving with her into her memories and helping her find the way back out.

Characters

Main
 Aelin Ashryver Whitethorn Galathynius, also known as Celaena Sardothien, is the main protagonist of the series. When she was young, her parents were murdered and she was found near-dead by Arobynn Hamel. Trained from childhood to become an assassin, she earned a reputation as the greatest in the world. However, she was betrayed and imprisoned by her master in the salt mines of Endovier. Years later, Celaena is offered an opportunity to participate in a competition to become the King's Champion. If she wins, she must remain in the King of Adarlan's service for 4 years and will then be granted her freedom and a full pardon. In the following books it is revealed that she is the lost Princess of Terrasen. Her lineage makes her key in saving Adarlan from the Valg and grants her immense magical power. She is described as talented, clever, arrogant, beautiful and possessing striking physical features.
 Rowan Whitethorn: A full-blooded Fae who is over three centuries old. He has silver hair and pine-green eyes. He can take the form of a white-tailed hawk and his powers are ice and wind. A few hundred years prior to the events of Throne of Glass, his mate, Lyria, and their unborn child were killed. He was tasked with training Aelin when she came to Doranelle to see Maeve. He and Aelin eventually fall in love and marry, and were revealed to have been mates, even though Maeve had tricked Rowan into believing Lyria was his mate. 
 Dorian Havilliard, also known as the King of Adarlan, is the Second Dorian Havilliard. Havilliard chooses to sponsor Celaena as his contender for the competition to become his father's champion. He tries at times to stand up to his father, but he is never fully able to defy him. His best friend is the Captain of the Guard, Chaol Westfall. He is adept at solving problems and will search for the answers to questions even if no one else can or will help. He also possesses a great deal of loyalty, as he goes out of his way and endangers himself to protect his friends. Dorian is tall and lean, with raven-black hair with his eyes being sapphire blue. Dorian has inherited raw magic with the goal to hide it from his father. Dorian later falls in love with the witch Manon, heir to the Blackbeak clan.
 Manon Blackbeak Crochan: Manon is an Ironteeth witch and heir to the Blackbeak clan, one of the three clans in the Ironteeth witches. Her grandmother is the Blackbeak Matron. Her coven is known as the Thirteen, the fiercest coven in the Ironteeth witches. She went to Morath to train in fighting with wyverns, along with many other witches, where she develops a strong bond with her wyvern, Abraxos. She is revealed to be the last Crochan Queen. She is the key to unlocking the curse on the witches' homeland, the Western Wastes, as she was born of both Crochan and Ironteeth blood. Her father was a Crochan prince, and her mother an Ironteeth witch. Her alliances change in Empire of Storms, as she pursues change for a greater cause.
 Chaol Westfall: He is the Captain of the Guard, and is very wary of Celaena throughout the first and part of the second book, as he recognizes the threat she poses to the kingdom. He is very close to Dorian and is willing to sacrifice his life for him. Throughout the first book, Chaol helps Celaena get back into shape during the tournament, training diligently with her every morning. In the second book, he enters into a love affair with Celaena. This affair ends after the murder of Nehemia, which Celaena blames Chaol for, because Chaol did not warn Celaena about the threats against Nehemia's life. By the end of the series, they have rekindled their friendship, and Chaol has a new love, Yrene, a healer who cures the paralysis in his legs. Chaol has been described to have a friendly relationship with his guards, and they appear to trust and respect him he is very loyal and honest.

Recurring

 Princess Nehemia Ytger: She is a princess of the kingdom of Eyllwe, which is deciding to ally with Adarlan so its people won't be killed. She pretends that she can only speak in her native tongue and doesn't understand what people say when they are speaking; in the first book, she has Celaena teach her how to speak the common tongue. She is a very strong-willed person and refuses to be looked down upon. Her weapon is her staff that the people from her kingdom produce. She is able to communicate with Celaena because Celaena can speak in Nehemia's language. Nehemia eventually manipulates an acquaintance into killing her to motivate Celaena to free Terrasen, Eyllwe, and other countries from Adarlan.
 Aedion aka Wolf of the North: Aelin's cousin, demi-fae with enhanced senses but no magic. Aedion has Aelin's snarky, sarcastic attitude and her self-confidence. He is unfailingly loyal, and willing to die for his queen. Aedion is bisexual, revealing to Lysandra that he is attracted to people regardless of gender. Aedion is tall (6'3"), heavily muscled, and handsome, a tanned complexion, long, golden blonde hair and turquoise eyes ringed with gold.
 Kaltain Rompier: Kaltain is a young lady who comes from a family that is fairly rich. She comes to the palace as the guest of Duke Perrington so she can get close to Dorian and marry him. She is willing to do anything to become Dorian's bride and to be in a position of power. She is imprisoned by Perrington and given to a Valg prince, who she secretly destroys. She has a rare form of magic called shadowfire. Later in the series, she redeems herself when she gives Elide Lochan a Wyrdkey, then destroys herself along with a part of Morath.
 The King of Adarlan: Dorian Havilliard the First is the initially unnamed father and ruler of the Adarlanian Empire. He is the current monarch of the Empire and Head of House Havilliard. He was the father of Dorian and Hollin Havilliard, and the husband of Georgina Havilliard. The King was described as having no resemblance to his son Dorian; he had a broad frame with a round face and craggy features, and sharp eyes, with one of his eyebrows scarred. When the King was younger and before he had been taken over by the Valg, he was much like his son Dorian. However, he was inhabited by the Valg when he was still young, which changed him, making him tyrannical and sociopathic. Under the Valg's control, the King became a ruler who took great pleasure in exerting his will over others. He did not appear to care about anything other than himself and gaining more power. Had he never been possessed, he would have been a loving and kind father, which he showed to his son in Kingdom of Ash.
 Lysandra: A former courtesan who worked with Arobynn Hamel. The earliest depiction we see of Lysandra is a spoiled girl who always gets what she wants, along with frequently getting in the way of her 'nemesis,' Celaena Sardothien. As the series progresses, however, she displays a sharp mind, courage, and kindness. She takes a small girl named Evangeline under her wing, which causes Aelin to begin to trust her again. Throughout the series, Lysandra proves herself to be a loyal and courageous member of the new court of Terrasen. She is fiercely loyal and very dedicated to creating a better world for Evangeline. Lysandra can shapeshift into any animal or human that she wills, however prefers her ghost leopard and wyvern forms. Lysandra is introduced as a stunningly beautiful, curvy woman with dark brown hair reaching down her shoulders and back, pale skin, emerald eyes and full lips.

Development

Background
Sarah J. Maas has cited Disney's Cinderella as an inspiration for writing Throne of Glass. While viewing the scene in which the heroine flees the ball, Maas found the soundtrack "way too dark and intense". This led her to re-imagine a number of details. "The music fit much better when I imagined a thief—no, an assassin!—fleeing the palace," she said. "But who was she? Who had sent her to kill the prince? Who might the prince's enemies be? A powerful, corrupt empire, perhaps?"

Originally known as Queen of Glass, the story initially appeared on FictionPress.com. Bloomsbury acquired the novel in 2010, and purchased two additional Throne of Glass novels in 2012. Publicist Emma Bradshaw noted Maas' "huge online following, particularly in the US". Additionally, Throne of Glass became the first Bloomsbury children's novel to be featured on Netgalley.com, attracting requests "from all over the world."

Following its acquisition by Bloomsbury, the story went through a number of revisions prior to publication. Regarding the tale's development, Maas stated, "In the 10 years that I've been working on the series, Throne of Glass has become more of an original epic fantasy than a Cinderella retelling, but you can still find a few nods to the legend here and there."

Characters

In an interview prior to the series' debut, Maas discussed the process of creating her protagonist:

The story's teenage heroine, Celaena Sardothien, is introduced as an orphan who was raised and trained by an assassin. She is characterized as skilled, arrogant, and witty. While shaping her protagonist, Maas was inspired by the heroism of Eowyn from The Lord of the Rings, and by the characterization of Velma Kelly from Chicago. Maas has stated that the latter's "arrogance and fierceness made me want to write about a woman like her—about a woman who never once said sorry for being talented and determined and utterly in love with herself."

The author ultimately designed Celaena as a highly capable character whose talents also form a basis for numerous faults. In interviews preceding the series' release, Maas noted her heroine's issues with "impatience" and "vanity". She also suggested that Celaena would grow while adjusting to her new role. In addition to Celaena's skills as an assassin, Maas wanted the character to have several traits and hobbies befitting her age, including a fondness for "shopping, books, and fine dining", as well as a "penchant for getting into trouble."

In creating the friendship between Celaena and Chaol, Maas gave the characters a number of differences. As the story begins, Chaol is introduced as a strict and ethical captain, while Celaena is presented as a morally ambiguous assassin. According to the author, this contrast contributes to Chaol's character development as his bond with Celaena grows. Amidst their experiences, Chaol eventually comes to view her not just as a captive criminal, but also "as a human being." While writing the novel, Maas envisioned Chaol as a character who had "always seen the world in black and white," and concluded that "Celaena just throws a wrench in that."

Prince Dorian is presented as a suitor for Celaena as well. However, their relationship is complicated by his status as the crown prince.

Release

Publicity
In anticipation of the series' debut, Bloomsbury released e-book editions of four prequel novellas—The Assassin and the Pirate Lord, The Assassin and the Desert, The Assassin and the Underworld, and The Assassin and the Empire—between January and July 2012. Throne of Glass was previewed by Publishers Weekly in February, while the book trailer premiered on MTV.com in May.  Additionally, film option rights were acquired by Creative Artists Agency.

Reception
Throne of Glass has received generally positive reviews, making its debut on the New York Times Best Seller list with the release of the second novel, Crown of Midnight. A review from Publishers Weekly lauded the series' opening as a "strong debut novel." The review went on to state, "This is not cuddly romance, but neither is it grim. Celaena is trained to murder, yet she hasn’t lost her taste for pretty dresses or good books, and a gleam of optimism tinges her outlook. Maas tends toward overdescription, but the verve and freshness of the narration make for a thrilling read." The Guardian gave it 5 stars out of 5 with the author of the review stating that the main character, Celaena, was more "relatable" than most other female protagonists. In her review for USA Today, Serena Chase called Celaena a "next-level Cinderella".

Kirkus stated, "A teenage assassin, a rebel princess, menacing gargoyles, supernatural portals and a glass castle prove to be as thrilling as they sound." With regard to the protagonist, Kirkus noted that "Celaena is still just a teenager trying to forge her way, giving the story timelessness. She might be in the throes of a bloodthirsty competition, but that doesn't mean she's not in turmoil over which tall, dark and handsomely titled man of the royal court should be her boyfriend—and which fancy gown she should wear to a costume party." The review concluded that the story's "commingling of comedy, brutality and fantasy evokes a rich alternate universe with a spitfire young woman as its brightest star."

Throne of Glass was named Amazon.com's "Best Book of the Month for Kids & Teens" in August 2012. Whitney Kate Sullivan of Romantic Times stated that "Maas' YA fantasy world is one of the most compelling that this reviewer has visited all year. The assassin heroine's growth and the multilayered secondary characters are amazing." Serena Chase of USA Today applauded the story's love triangle, and noted that "Maas excels at world building, spicing up this unusual take on the Cinderella story by injecting myths, fairy tales and religious traditions with the magic of a fresh and faulted world. Whereas many authors rely on geographic detail to build their worlds, Maas' environment is more politically driven and her characterizations are deftly drawn to support that sort of structure." Chase also commended Maas for creating "a truly remarkable heroine who doesn't sacrifice the grit that makes her real in order to do what's right in the end."

Awards
The awards the author has received are as follows:

Accolades

Television adaptation 
In September 2016, it was announced that the Throne of Glass series had been opted for a television adaptation by Hulu and Disney-ABC Domestic Television. The series was set to be titled Queen of Shadows, named after the fourth novel in the series, with The Mark Gordon Company serving as the main project studio. The adaptation was to be written by Kira Snyder, who also wrote The 100, with the pilot potentially to be directed by Anna Foerster.
As of 2020, the rights have since reverted to Maas.

See also

References

American fantasy novels
Book series introduced in 2012
Fantasy novel series
Novels set in fictional countries
Young adult fantasy novels